Zum Teufel mit der Penne is a 1968 West German comedy film directed by Werner Jacobs and starring Peter Alexander, Hansi Kraus and Hannelore Elsner. Its English title is To Hell with School. It was the second in the 7-part  series of comedy films.

Cast
 Peter Alexander as Dr. Roland
 Hansi Kraus as Pepe Notnagel
 Hannelore Elsner as Marion Notnagel
 Theo Lingen as Oberstudiendirektor (headmaster) Dr. Gottlieb Taft
 Willy Millowitsch as Kurt Notnagel
 Balduin Baas as Studienrat Blaumeier
 Rudolf Schündler as Studienrat Knörz
 Sabine Bethmann as Frau Tell
  as Studienrätin Pollhagen
 Joachim Teege as Dr. Wilhelm Maria Tell
  as Pierre de Dent
  as Oberin (Mother Superior)
 Gerd Vespermann as Stohler
  as Pedell (bedel) Bloch
 Heintje Simons as himself
 Heidrun Hankammer as Secretary to de Dent
 Johanna König as Fräulein Weidt

External links

1968 films
1968 comedy films
German comedy films
West German films
1960s German-language films
Films directed by Werner Jacobs
Films about educators
Films shot in Berlin
1960s German films